Balgarrett is a townland in the civil parish of Mullingar in County Westmeath, Ireland.

The townland is located to the west of Mullingar town, and the Royal Canal flows to the east of the townland.

References 

Townlands of County Westmeath